Conley v. Gibson, 355 U.S. 41 (1957), was a case decided by the Supreme Court of the United States that provided a basis for a broad reading of the "short plain statement" requirement for pleading under Rule 8 of the Federal Rules of Civil Procedure.

Opinion of the Court
The case arose from an alleged wrongful discharge of African-American employees from a railroad company and unequal protection from the union.  The court ruled that general allegations of discrimination were sufficient to fulfill the Rule 8 requirement of a "short plain statement" because liberal discovery guidelines allowed the complaint to gain much more specificity before trial.  The kind of pleading allowed by Conley was known as "notice pleading."

Conley presumes that the plaintiff's allegations are true, the facts are construed as most favorable to the plaintiff, and the case cannot be dismissed unless it is proven that the plaintiff can prove no set of facts.

Subsequent developments
In 2007, the United States Supreme Court overruled Conley, creating a new, stricter standard of a pleading's required specificity.  Under the standard the Court set forth in Conley, a complaint need only state facts which make it "conceivable" that it could prove its legal claims—that is, that a court could only dismiss a claim if it appeared, beyond a doubt, that the plaintiff would be able to prove "no set of facts" in support of her claim that would entitle her to relief. In Bell Atlantic Corp. v. Twombly, the court adopted a more strict, "plausibility" standard, requiring in this case "enough fact[s] to raise a reasonable expectation that discovery will reveal evidence of illegal agreement." The Twombly reading was upheld in Ashcroft v. Iqbal in 2009.

See also
List of United States Supreme Court cases, volume 355

References

External links

United States Supreme Court cases
United States motion to dismiss case law
1957 in United States case law
United States Supreme Court cases of the Warren Court